Pure Colour is a novel which explores the human condition and is written by Canadian author Sheila Heti. Published by Knopf Canada,  the book won the 2022 Governor General's Literary Award for English-language fiction.

Synopsis 

Pure Colour is a novel about art, love, death, and time from beginning to end. Heti tells the story of a girl named Mira, her relationship with her father and how she deals with his death, and her love for Annie.

Awards 
Pure Colour won the Governor General's Award for English-language fiction at the 2022 Governor General's Awards, and was long-listed for the 2022 Giller Prize.

Reception 

Pure Colour was generally well received in Canada and the United States. Dwight Garner, journalist for The New York Times writes, “Just like that, there’s magic", and "Heti owns a sharp axe. In Pure Colour the wood chips that fall are as interesting as the sculpture that gets made.” At The New Yorker, American journalist and author Douglas Preston adds "This book, so full of argument, feels weightless. I note this with wonder. . . Heti’s books aim to be vessels for the transformation of reader and writer.” In The Globe and Mail, Nicole Thompson from The Canadian Press calls the novel "a strange and meditative book".

References 

2022 Canadian novels
Governor General's Award-winning fiction books